The R762 road is a regional road in County Wicklow, Ireland, which connects the R761 at Greystones to the N11 national primary road.

The route runs east via Rathdown Road, turns south through the town as Church Road before turning west as Mill Road.  It again intersects the R761 via a double junction at Delgany and then runs eastwards as Delgany Road and then Glen Road before terminating in the N11 at junction 10 located at the southern end of the Glen of the Downs Nature reserve.

See also
Roads in Ireland
National primary road
National secondary road

References
Roads Act 1993 (Classification of Regional Roads) Order 2006 – Department of Transport

Regional roads in the Republic of Ireland
Roads in County Wicklow